François Sterchele (14 March 1982 – 8 May 2008) was a Belgian professional footballer who played for Germinal Beerschot and Club Brugge. The striker was the top scorer of the Jupiler League in 2006–07. Sterchele died in a single-person car accident on 8 May 2008.

Club career
Sterchele started his career at FC Loncin, a small team from the Belgian Provincial leagues in the province of Liège. At the age of ten, he moved to R.F.C. de Liège where he stayed for ten years before moving to R.F.C. Union La Calamine. After three seasons, he was signed by Oud-Heverlee Leuven, a team in the third division, where he scored 21 goals during the 2004–05 season, finishing second in the topscorers list. In the subsequent playoffs, he scored another eight goals which would help earn the team to promotion to the second tier.

As a result, Sterchele was able to secure a transfer to the top division in Belgian football, the Jupiler League, when he joined Charleroi, where he was trained by Jacky Mathijssen, who would become a considerable influence in his development as a footballer. After just one year, he went to K.F.C. Germinal Beerschot and became the league's top scorer.

On 19 July 2007, Sterchele returned to the tutorship of Mathijssen when he moved to Club Brugge; he scored two goals on his league début against Mons.

Death
In the early morning of 8 May 2008, Sterchele was killed instantly when he crashed his Porsche Cayman S into a tree.

The previous day, Sterchele had visited some friends in Antwerp and was supposed to meet with Jurgen Cavens and Vicenzo Verhoeven. While travelling home on the N49 between Antwerp and Knokke, at around 03:00 CEST on 8 May, Sterchele lost control of his Porsche while speeding and veered into a ditch before hitting a tree. No other vehicles were involved in the accident. Sterchele was pronounced dead at the scene.

Tributes
Club Brugge, Sterchele's last club, decided to retire the number 23 in honor of their deceased striker. The fans of Club Brugge also started singing his name in the 23rd minute of every game their team plays. While playing against them in the Europa League, the fans of Birmingham City F.C. clapped to show their respect, and also carried the tribute out at their home ground, St. Andrews.
Also there is the "Coppa Sterchele", each year two of his ex-teams play a friendly match to honor him.

References

External links
 

1982 births
2008 deaths
Road incident deaths in Belgium
Footballers from Liège
Association football forwards
Belgian footballers
Belgium international footballers
Belgian Pro League players
Oud-Heverlee Leuven players
R. Charleroi S.C. players
Beerschot A.C. players
Club Brugge KV players
Belgian people of Italian descent